Rhabdopterus is a genus of leaf beetles in the subfamily Eumolpinae. There are about 70 described species in Rhabdopterus from North and South America, eight of which are found north of Mexico. The Nearctic species may not be congeneric with the type species, which is South American.

Gallery

Species
These species belong to the genus Rhabdopterus:

 Rhabdopterus aciculatus Bowditch, 1921
 Rhabdopterus amazonicus Jacoby, 1900
 Rhabdopterus angulicollis Bowditch, 1921
 Rhabdopterus angustipenis Schultz, 1977 i c g
 Rhabdopterus apicicornis Jacoby, 1900
 Rhabdopterus apicipes Jacoby, 1900
 Rhabdopterus aureolus Lefèvre, 1891
 Rhabdopterus bacca (Erichson, 1847)
 Rhabdopterus bacca bacca (Erichson, 1847)
 Rhabdopterus bacca beniensis Bechyné, 1957
 Rhabdopterus baturitensis Bechyné, 1953
 Rhabdopterus blatchleyi Bowditch, 1921 i c g
 Rhabdopterus bottimeri Barber, 1946 i c g
 Rhabdopterus bowditchi Barber, 1943 i c g
 Rhabdopterus brasiliensis Bechyné, 1950
 Rhabdopterus bricenoi Bechyné, 1997
 Rhabdopterus bucki Bechyné, 1954
 Rhabdopterus caliginosus (Lefèvre, 1878)
 Rhabdopterus caraguatensis Bechyné, 1954
 Rhabdopterus chalceus Lefèvre, 1891
 Rhabdopterus chiliensis Lefèvre, 1885
 Rhabdopterus chontalensis (Jacoby, 1882)
 Rhabdopterus circumdatus Lefèvre, 1889
 Rhabdopterus colombiensis Jacoby, 1900
 Rhabdopterus constricticollis Bechyné, 1950
 Rhabdopterus cupreatus Lefèvre, 1885
 Rhabdopterus cuprinus Lefèvre, 1889
 Rhabdopterus curtus (Lefèvre, 1878)
 Rhabdopterus deceptor Barber, 1943 i c g b
 Rhabdopterus decipiens Lefèvre, 1886 g
 Rhabdopterus delectator Bechyné, 1950
 Rhabdopterus elcieli Moseyko, Maldonado, Ruiz Cancino & Coronado Blanco, 2013
 Rhabdopterus freyi Bechyné, 1950
 Rhabdopterus frontalis Bechyné, 1953
 Rhabdopterus fulvipes (Jacoby, 1882)
 Rhabdopterus fulvus Jacoby, 1890
 Rhabdopterus grenadensis Bowditch, 1921
 Rhabdopterus grossus Bechyné, 1955
 Rhabdopterus guatemalensis (Jacoby, 1882)
 Rhabdopterus hypochalceus (Harold, 1875)
 Rhabdopterus ignotus Bowditch, 1921
 Rhabdopterus imitans Jacoby, 1900
 Rhabdopterus intermedius (Jacoby, 1882)
 Rhabdopterus januarius Bechyné, 1950
 Rhabdopterus januarius itataiensis Bechyné, 1951
 Rhabdopterus januarius januarius Bechyné, 1950
 Rhabdopterus kirschi Lefèvre, 1885
 Rhabdopterus lateralis Lefèvre, 1891
 Rhabdopterus limbalis Lefèvre, 1885 g
 Rhabdopterus martinezorum Bechyné, 1951
 Rhabdopterus monstrosipes Bechyné, 1951
 Rhabdopterus montalbanus Bechyné, 1997
 Rhabdopterus nigrostillatus Bechyné, 1955
 Rhabdopterus obsitus Lefèvre, 1885
 Rhabdopterus obsoletus Bechyné, 1949
 Rhabdopterus oralis Bechyné, 1953
 Rhabdopterus orthopleurus Bechyné & Bechyne, 1969
 Rhabdopterus panamensis (Blake, 1976)
 Rhabdopterus perplexus (Jacoby, 1882)
 Rhabdopterus peruensis Jacoby, 1900
 Rhabdopterus picipes (Olivier, 1808) i c g b (cranberry rootworm)
 Rhabdopterus plaumanni Bechyné, 1954
 Rhabdopterus praetextus (Say, 1824) i c g b
 Rhabdopterus punctatissimus Bowditch, 1921
 Rhabdopterus punctatosulcatus Lefèvre, 1891
 Rhabdopterus rosenbergi Bowditch, 1921
 Rhabdopterus scabrosus Lefèvre, 1891
 Rhabdopterus similis Bowditch, 1921
 Rhabdopterus spurcaticornis (Erichson, 1847)
 Rhabdopterus subelongatus Bechyné, 1951
 Rhabdopterus sulcipennis Bowditch, 1921
 Rhabdopterus tarsatus Bowditch, 1921
 Rhabdopterus thoracicus (Jacoby, 1882)
 Rhabdopterus tuberculatus (Lefèvre, 1878)
 Rhabdopterus uncotibialis (Blake, 1976)
 Rhabdopterus venezuelensis Jacoby, 1900
 Rhabdopterus versutus Lefèvre, 1885
 Rhabdopterus victorianus Bechyné, 1997
 Rhabdopterus weisei (Schaeffer, 1920) i c g b
 Rhabdopterus weyrauchi Bechyné, 1950

Synonyms:
 Rhabdopterus bryanti Bechyné, 1950: synonym of Anachalcoplacis fulva fulva (Fabricius, 1801)
 Rhabdopterus fulvicollis Jacoby, 1900: moved to Chalcoplacis
 Rhabdopterus jansoni (Jacoby, 1882): moved to Rhabdocolaspis
 Rhabdopterus mexicanus (Jacoby, 1882): moved to Rhabdocolaspis
 Rhabdopterus virescens (Erichson, 1848) g: moved to Chalcoplacis

Data sources: i = ITIS, c = Catalogue of Life, g = GBIF, b = Bugguide.net

References

Further reading

External links

 

Eumolpinae
Chrysomelidae genera
Articles created by Qbugbot
Beetles of North America
Beetles of South America
Taxa named by Édouard Lefèvre